Lycée Français Jean-Marie Gustave Le Clézio or Port Vila French Lycée (Lycée français de Port-Vila) is a French international school in Port-Vila, Vanuatu.

Description 
It was named after French author J. M. G. Le Clézio. It serves maternelle (preschool) through terminale, the final year of lycée (sixth form/senior high school).

The Lycée de Port Vila was established in 1981. In 1987 one sixth (sixth to last) class and fifth (fifth to last) class opened. Additional grade levels were added until 1992, when the first graduates received their baccalauréat degrees.

It is the most eastern school in the AEFE network, and the only French high school abroad in the entire Pacific Island.

Curriculum
The school offers the full length of French curriculum, from maternelle to baccalauréat. Foreign languages include English, Spanish and Mandarin Chinese.

See also
 France–Vanuatu relations

References

External links
 Lycée Français J. M. G. Le Clézio

French international schools in Oceania
Schools in Vanuatu
Port Vila
Educational institutions established in 1981
1981 establishments in Vanuatu